Daniel Santos may refer to:

Daniel Santos (singer) (1916–1992), Puerto Rican singer and composer
Daniel Santos (boxer) (born 1975), Puerto Rican boxer
Daniel Dos Santos (born 1978), comic book illustrator
Daniel Santos in Bitten